Jürgen Rijkers (born 13 February 1967), better known by his stage name DJ Jurgen, is a Dutch DJ, remixer and producer. He was the co-creator of Alice Deejay, and their biggest hit, "Better Off Alone", was credited to "DJ Jurgen presents Alice Deejay". As a solo artist, he also had an international hit with “Higher and Higher”, which peaked at number 34 on Billboard’s Dance Club Songs chart in 2000.
Currently, Jurgen hosts the morning show on Wild FM.

Discography

Singles

References

External links

 Discography of DJ Jurgen provided by discogs.com
 Biographical profile of DJ Jurgen provided by djguide.nl

1967 births
Living people
Dutch dance musicians
Dutch DJs
Dutch record producers
People from Delft
Electronic dance music DJs